Olivia Burnette (born March 24, 1977) is an American actress who began her career as a child actress at the age of six. She is perhaps best known for her role in the NBC sitcom The Torkelsons (1991–1993), Homeless Woman in Sons of Anarchy (2008-2014) and Steve Martin's daughter in Planes, Trains and Automobiles (1987).

Early life
She was born in San Clemente, California, USA. She left her native California to receive a college education. Burnette enrolled in NYU's Tisch School of the Arts. Olivia graduated with a double major in Film and English.

Career
Burnette began her career at age six. Perhaps her most famous role was that of Dorothy Jane Torkelson on the NBC sitcom The Torkelsons, later renamed Almost Home. She also played two roles on the NBC series Quantum Leap, making a guest appearance in the episode "Another Mother" before later appearing as Sam's sister Katie in the episode "The Leap Home." She has since appeared on both JAG and its spin-off, NCIS (playing different characters).

In 1991, Burnette co-starred in the TNT drama Final Verdict.

Burnette also produced the short film, Mountain Cry.

Personal life
Olivia is married to musician Julian Sakata.

Filmography

Film

Television

References

External links

 
 

1977 births
Living people
20th-century American actresses
21st-century American actresses
Actresses from California
American child actresses
American film actresses
American television actresses